The Basilica Minore of Our Lady of Charity (Spanish: Basilica Menor de Nuestra Señora de la Caridad), better known as Agoo Basilica, is a Roman Catholic minor basilica in Agoo, La Union, the Philippines dedicated to Our Lady of Charity. It is the seat of the Santa Monica Parish of the Roman Catholic Diocese of San Fernando de La Union under the Vicariate of St. Francis Xavier (Vicar Forane Raul S. Panay). The diocese of San Fernando La Union is part of the territory of the Archdiocese of Nueva Segovia. The basilica is under the leadership of parish priest Alfonso V. Lacsamana and parish vicar Liberato A. Apusen. It is situated along MacArthur Highway in Agoo, La Union in front of the Jose D. Aspiras Civic Center.

History

The parish was founded in 1578 by Franciscan friars John Baptist Lucarelli of Pesaro, Italy, and Sebastián de San Francisco of Baesa, Spain. The original church was constructed with native materials, nipa and bamboo (in Barangay Nagreban or Nagrugcan) under its patron saint Francis of Assisi. In 1598, Saturmino Franco, Casimiro Melgosa and Aquilino García finished a three-tiered bell tower for the church. In the same year, the Augustinians named Saint Monica as the town's new patron saint.

On March 16, 1892, a massive earthquake destroyed the church, paving the way for reconstruction of the shrine of "Nuestra Señora de Caridad" in 1893. It was later demolished and replaced with the present church in 1975.

Construction and consecration

The present church was started with the laying of cornerstone on September 8, 1975. The church was finished and consecrated as a Marian shrine on December 8, 1978, by Cardinal Sebastiano Baggio coinciding with the quadricentennial of the Christianization of Agoo.

Cardinal Agostino Casaroli's re-script dated July 15, 1982, signed for Pope John Paul II, granted Bishop Salvador Lazo's petition elevating the Shrine of Our Lady of Charity to a minor basilica. In the Philippines, the Vatican granted 12 minor basilicas, with the Agoo Basilica as the sixth in order of their institution.

1990 Luzon earthquake

The basilica was badly damaged during the catastrophic 7.7-magnitude Luzon earthquake of July 16, 1990, which struck at 4.26 p.m. badly annihilating Agoo, La Union and other coastal areas. The basilica was again repaired and renovated.

The bell tower, the only remaining structure of the 1893 building, crashed during the earthquake of 1990.

Plaza del Beato Juan Pablo II and the new belfry

On May 1, 2001, a historical marble marker was laid in the basilica's belfry and bell tower upon solemn dedication of the new Plaza de Beato Juan Pablo II and the new belfry by Bishop Artemio L. Rillera. The new belfry and bell tower replaced the previous tower destroyed by the 1990 earthquake.

Architectural details
The Basilica Minore of Our Lady of Charity is noted for its Mexican-Baroque architectural features. A rosette stained glass window upon the basilica's facade is a marked contrast to the gray color of the front wall. Amid the statues of Saints Peter and Paul statues at the main door are carved Hebrew scripts, which is a short form of the Ten Commandments.

Agoo Basilica's unconventional architecture is demonstrated by its two non-identical bell towers. To the left of the facade is a four-level hexagonal tower, while the right bell tower is a bell-gable in its form. The confessional and the ceiling has a similar architecture. One is in front of the stained glass window of the Crucifixion of Jesus with the two thieves.

The reredos of the altar has eight wooden panels with intricately carved floral design focused on its center. At the top center of the panel hangs a large crucifix. Above the panel is where the foot-high Our Lady of Charity statue is enshrined under large canopy supported by four twisted columns. Her feet rest on an urn-shaped pedestal with the same floral design as the reredos. Two angels flanked her sides behind a silvery backdrop.

A pipe organ in the choir loft watches the craved chandeliers dotting the middle aisle, 2-tiered and carved or made of Filipino mahogany, demonstrating the rich heritage and vast culture of Agoo.

The basilica has preserved stone blocks dragged from the original church amid its charming garden, an old wishing well and the interior mural "The Second Coming of Christ" (by Rey Gimeno).

Our Lady of Charity

The 17th-century wooden statue of Our Lady of Charity was first venerated and enthroned in Bantay, Ilocos Sur and brought to Agoo by an Augustinian priest. It was Maximo Vicente of Manila who refurbished it after it survived the massive earthquake of 1892.

The crowned head of the original statue is made of baked clay covered with a polished coat of fine white powder. The child Jesus raises his right hand as in a blessing, and holding a golden globe on his left hand.

Bishop Victorino C. Ligot of the Roman Catholic Diocese of San Fernando de La Union filed the ecclesiastical petition to the Sacred Congregation for the Sacraments and Divine Worship in Rome for the canonical coronation of the statue, with the collaboration of Jose D. Aspiras, who helped restored the belfry.

The Marian image, locally called as "Apo Caridad", was crowned on May 1, 1971, by Apostolic Nuncio Carmine Rocco, the appointed Apostolic Nunciature to the Philippines. Later, the statue was desecrated by local bandits with the theft of its previous jewel-studded ivory head.

The innumerable miraculous accounts attributed to Apo Caridad in the basilica's altar, which includes the quick recovery of Agoo from the destruction of the July 1990 massive quake, has made Agoo a major religious center in northern Luzon. Our Lady of Charity's feast day is celebrated every May 4, on the feast of Saint Monica, in whose honor both the basilica parish and museum are dedicated.

Santa Monica Parish Museum

The basilica's Santa Monica Museum is located to the left of the church at the Bishop Mariano A. Madriaga Hall. The 1815 Bell of Santa Monica Parish, located at the ground floor of the museum, is the main attraction at the entrance of the museum which also displays the portraits of the basilica's principal donor, Jose D. Aspiras and wife. The heritage church bell was discovered at Bugallon, Pangasinan in 1963.

The second floor contains the extensive memorabilia of Agoo Archbishop Mariano A. Madriaga and Archbishop Antonio L. Mabutas (b. June 13, 1921-d. April 22, 1999). Mabutas was born in Agoo, La Union, who became the Bishop of Laoag and later, Archbishop of Davao on December 9, 1972. He served as a bishop for 37 years and a priest for a total of 53 years. He was a Datu Bago awardee, a recognition given by the Davao City government to its outstanding residents.

Image gallery

See also

 List of basilicas

References

Sources

External links

Buildings and structures in La Union
Philippines
Basilica churches in the Philippines
Catholic pilgrimage sites
Roman Catholic churches completed in 1578
16th-century Roman Catholic church buildings in the Philippines
Shrines to the Virgin Mary
Titles of Mary
National Historical Landmarks of the Philippines
Spanish Colonial architecture in the Philippines
Baroque architecture in the Philippines
Roman Catholic churches in La Union
Roman Catholic churches completed in 1533
Churches in the Roman Catholic Diocese of San Fernando de La Union